Elektronika B3-36, renamed to Elektronika MK-36 later in the production, is a soviet calculator. It was produced since 1979. It is able to perform four arithmetic operations: calculating natural and decimal logarithms, antilogarithms, direct and inverse trigonometric functions, reciprocals, factorial, perform calculations with two-level brackets, exponentiation, extraction of roots, do basic operations with its memory. Very few changes were made when it was renamed to "Elektronika MK-36" in 1986.

It was designed for scientific calculations and engineering. Elektronika MK-36 is able to operate on either three Д-0,25 soviet batteries or when connected to the power grid.

Price 
The price in the year 1979 was 220 rubles, 120 rubles since 1980, 70 rubles since December 1981.

References 

Elektronika calculators